Hypocrates may refer to:

 misspelling of Hippocrates
 Hypocrates (song), by Welsh singer Marina Diamandis